The 2022 Waterloo Region municipal elections were held on October 24, 2022, in the Regional Municipality of Waterloo, Ontario, Canada, to elect Waterloo Regional Council, the mayors and city councils of Cambridge, Kitchener, North Dumfries, Waterloo, Wellesley, Wilmot, and Woolwich, the Waterloo Region District School Board (Public), the Waterloo Catholic District School Board, and the regional members of Conseil Scolaire de District Catholiques Centre-Sud and Conseil Scolaire Viamonde (Public). The election will be held in conjunction with the province wide 2022 municipal elections.

 
(X) denotes incumbent.

Waterloo Regional Council

Chair
Incumbent chair Karen Redman ran for re-election.

Council
Waterloo Regional Council includes the chair, the mayors of the seven constituent municipalities (see below) and eight directly elected councillors from the three main cities:

Cambridge
List of candidates:

Mayor

Incumbent mayor Kathryn McGarry ran against city councillor Jan Liggett.

Cambridge City Council

Kitchener
List of candidates:

Mayor

Mayor Berry Vrbanovic ran for re-election.

Kitchener City Council

North Dumfries
Sue Foxton was re-elected as mayor by acclamation:

Mayor

Waterloo
List of candidates:

Mayor

Incumbent mayor Dave Jaworsky did not seek re-election.

Waterloo City Council

Wellesley
Joe Nowak was re-elected mayor by acclamation.

Mayor

Wilmot
The following were the results for mayor.

Mayor
Incumbent mayor Les Armstrong did not run for re-election. Councillor Jenn Pfenning ran to replace him.

Woolwich
The following were the results for mayor:

Mayor
Incumbent mayor Sandy Shantz ran for re-election. Councillor Pat Merlihan ran against her.

References 

Waterloo
Politics of the Regional Municipality of Waterloo